Heiner Dopp (born 27 June 1956 in Bad Dürkheim, Rheinland-Pfalz) is a former field hockey player from West Germany, who competed at three Summer Olympics for his native country. He won the silver medal with his team, in 1984 (Los Angeles) and in 1988 (Seoul). Dopp made his Olympic debut in 1976 (Montreal). 

He played 286 international matches for the national team, and won the German club title eight times with TG Frankenthal. After his hockey career he got engaged in local politics. In 1999 he became mayor of his home town Meckenheim.

References

External links
 

1956 births
Living people
People from Bad Dürkheim
Sportspeople from Rhineland-Palatinate
German male field hockey players
Olympic field hockey players of West Germany
Olympic silver medalists for West Germany
Field hockey players at the 1976 Summer Olympics
Field hockey players at the 1984 Summer Olympics
Field hockey players at the 1988 Summer Olympics
Olympic medalists in field hockey
Medalists at the 1984 Summer Olympics
Medalists at the 1988 Summer Olympics
20th-century German people